Təhlə is a village in the municipality of Yeni yol in the Goranboy Rayon of Azerbaijan.

References

Populated places in Goranboy District